Ken Burton (born January 5, 1970) is a British choral and orchestral conductor, composer, performer, producer, presenter, arranger and judge, known for his work on UK television programmes, particularly on BBC1 Songs Of Praise, on which he appears regularly as a conductor, musical director, arranger, singer, judge, music producer, and music consultant. He was choirmaster for the multi Oscar winning and Grammy winning Marvel film Black Panther, and one of the credited choral conductors on the film Jingle Jangle and has also contributed as a conductor, contractor, and singer to a number of other films including Amazing Grace, and Ugly Dolls.

Biography
Burton's parents relocated from the West Indies to the United Kingdom, and he attributes his love for music to early childhood home experiences, which included listening to older siblings rehearse their instruments, and family spiritual gatherings, where singing would take place, often in harmony. He attended the Ryelands Primary School in South Norwood, where he was actively involved with music, including playing in the newly formed steel band. His participation in the steel band was the subject of a local newspaper feature on his music-making activity.  He went on to become a choirmaster, specialising in gospel music at the church he attended, the Selhurst Seventh-Day Adventist Church. He is still an active member of that church, and still directs the choir.

Burton's choirs first gained national attention in 1994 when The London Adventist Chorale and the Croydon Seventh-Day Adventist Gospel Choir won the Sainsbury's Choir of the Year competition, broadcast nationally in the UK on the BBC. His choral activities also involves directorship of BBC Songs of Praise session choir, Adventist Vocal Ensemble (AVE). Burton also formed, and performs with, the group Tessera, also a regular on BBC Songs of Praise.

As a conductor, singer, and instrumentalist, he has performed on many of the world's major stages including Wembley Stadium, Universal Studios (Florida), Sydney Opera House and the Royal Albert Hall. His orchestral music has been played by several of the UK's leading orchestras, among them BBC Orchestra and CBSO.
 
He has worked as a musical director, arranger, and collaborator with opera singers Bryn Terfel and Lesley Garrett, gospel singers Donnie McClurkin, Andraé Crouch and Helen Baylor, and has worked as a session musician for the UK's largest television show, "The X Factor", and the "US X Factor". He has contracted choirs, recorded soundtrack choral parts (some of them his own arrangements) for leading artists including Beyoncé, Christina Aguilera, will.i.am, Robbie Williams, and Leona Lewis.
 
In 2010, he was asked to assist in shaping an arrangement for a song of Lord Andrew Lloyd Webber.  This song was to be a gospel flavoured arrangement of Webber's "Love Never Dies", to be recorded by Nicole Scherzinger. The song was subsequently recorded, produced by Nigel Wright, with choral arrangements by Annie Skates. Burton provided the choir.
 
In 2007, he was commissioned to write a piece of music for double chorus, for a BBC Radio commemorative broadcast to commemorate the bicentenary of the Abolition of the Slave Trade Act. This piece was performed by the London Adventist Chorale and the choir of St John's College, Cambridge. A number of other collaborative pieces were written and subsequently recorded by the two choirs, although to date the recording has not been released.
 
Burton has produced a number of recordings with the Croydon Seventh-Day Adventist Gospel Choir, the first being a selection of songs titled "Until We Reach".

Burton has been presented to Queen Elizabeth II on five occasions: two Commonwealth days, Golden Jubilee 2002 (where he directed the London Adventist Chorale singing two of his arrangements of African-American spirituals at Buckingham Palace), the re-opening of the Royal Festival Hall Royal Gala Concert, and at a special jubilee multi-faith environment programme. All three of the choral entities he looks after (The Croydon SDA Gospel Choir, London Adventist Chorale and Adventist Vocal Ensemble) have performed, either uniquely or in collaboration, for numerous concerts attended Her Majesty The Queen and other members of the Royal family.

In February 2013, Ken Burton was a guest presenter for the BBC Radio 3 programme "The Choir". He presented a programme on choral gospel music which mixed with other genres.

In May 2013, he contracted a choir under the name Ken Burton Voices to perform at the Cannes Film Festival for Steven Spielberg, the head of the festival's 2013 jury. The choir performed "Miss Celie's Blues" from the film The Color Purple; the piece was arranged and conducted by jazz trumpeter Guy Barker; the lead vocalist was jazz singer Krystle Warren, and Grant Windsor was the accompanist.

Burton was a judge on the new eight-part series of BBC2's Sing While You Work, filmed in September 2013, with fellow judges Paul Mealor, and international soprano Sarah Fox.

In March 2014 Burton led the Hertford Choral Society's "Raise Your Voice" event.

In 2014 and 2015 he presented two series of programmes for online TV Channel LifeConnect. These programmes, called Music In My Life; With Ken Burton, saw him interviewing gospel artists, as well as talking about his own musical experiences. As part of the programme, in collaboration with the artist, he would create something on the spot.

In 2015, he headlined, and directed a workshop choir, in a sell-out concert at the NOSPR in Katowice. Later that year he travelled with his Croydon SDA Gospel Choir to perform at the quinquennial General Conference Of Seventh-Day Adventists, in San Antonio's Alamodome.

In 2016, he was a judge, alongside Connie Fisher and Katherine Jenkins, for the 2016 BBC Television short series of Songs Of Praise: School Choir Of The Year. Later that year he conducted his debut piece "No Many Could" number at the Proms, in a special gospel prom, presented by Michelle Williams of Destiny's Child.

In 2018, he was a judge, alongside Carrie Grant and JB Gill, for the 2018 BBC Television short series of Songs Of Praise; School Choir Of The Year.

Burton was approached to assemble and lead a choir of forty singers for the soundtrack of the Marvel film release Black Panther. Drawing largely from the professional British opera world, and others from the field of gospel, Jazz, and classical music, Burton was responsible for contracting, and generally advising in the recording sessions at London's Abbey Road Studios. The conductor for the film score was John Ashton Thomas. The composer was Ludwig Göransson. The film won several Oscars in 2019, including Best Soundtrack; the soundtrack also won a Grammy in 2019.  The collective name for the choir Burton assembled was the Voquality Singers. 

In 2019, Burton led a choir of twelve, in two BBC specials for Songs Of Praise, in the Holy Land. Featuring interviews, and songs, all arranged and produced by Burton, with one produced by both Ian Tilley and Burton, 

In 2020, Burton was commissioned to write a new piece for the vocal ensemble Voces8. This was premiered in the group's Live From London virtual concert.

Covid-19 programmes
The 2020 COVID-19 pandemic resulted in his European and UK touring and recording schedule being largely cancelled or put on hold. During the period when the UK was required to be on lockdown, Burton created a number of home-made programmes for his social media network. You're PUN-ished  is a short home-produced video,  using puns. Burton attributes his love of words to his late father, who was always playing with words, and also his language teachers in his secondary school who instilled a love for languages. He vividly remembers and often publicly shares about  a  moment in a German class where his German teacher started talking about a photograph and proceeded to use such phrases as "we will not focus on this any more, unless things develop further; so I shall close the shutter".  

Burton also produced a series of twenty short videos, which were shared with his social media network under the title Daily Focus. These short programmes consisted of a text from the Bible, or a poem; this would be followed by a short prayer, and a short song, which would be a popularly known hymn, or one of Burton's own compositions. In the second to last and last week of the series, Burton started to get song ideas whilst filming, which he shared on the videos.  

Burton also produced a series of audio greetings: short song compositions with messages. He had been doing this for a number of years for his siblings, and he decided to record a number of short thank you messages for key workers and the UK health services, using different genres of music,  among them opera and reggae.

Publications
In addition to his choral and vocal work, he has published several books with Oxford University Press (Christmas Spirituals for Choirs) and Faber Music(Feel the Spirit, 1996; Good News, 1998; Ready to Ride, 2000) and also has works published with Royal Schools Of Church Music. In 2014 he created the company Voquality, which also publishes some of his music.

Education 
Burton was educated at the Ryelands Primary School in South Norwood, London. During this time he learned piano initially under a local teacher, known only as Mrs Skull, and then under the late Margaret Carr (Singh), to whom Burton attributes his musicianship skills. He often shares how Mrs Singh would change the tune on her musical doorbell, and require Ken to name the key of the tune before allowing him into the house. At Ryelands School, Burton had music instruction under Mrs Shirley Hulme. 

He gained a music scholarship to the prestigious Trinity School in Croydon, Surrey. He gained O-levels in Combined Science, Music, French, German, English Language, English Literature, Mathematics, Biology and Religious Studies. He continued at the school, gaining A-levels in Music, French and German. At Trinity School he studied piano with the late David de Warrenne, and also learned violin under Stuart Robertson. Burton was an accompanist for the DW choir, which specialised in  arrangements of music, by De Warrenne himself. His academic music studies were with Mr David Squibb, Mr Stephen Johns, and Mr Simon Marriott. The school also had an organ, and Burton had several years of organ lessons with John Shepherd. 

Following school, he read music at Goldsmiths College, University of London. He made history at the university by becoming the first music student to gain 100% in an aural examination, which won him a prize. At the university he was active as an accompanist for both vocalists and instrumentalists, due to his strong sight-reading skills. He studied piano under Professor Andrew Ball at the Royal College of Music, and studied voice under the tenor Charles Corp. Burton was also accompanist for the chorus and sang with the chamber choir. Following graduation, he was appointed as chorusmaster, training the choir in such works as the Verdi Requiem , Brahms Deutsches Requiem , Brahms Libeslieder, Bernstein Chichester Psalms and a newly discovered Prokofiev posthumous work.

Burton continued professional studies, undertaking an intensive Trinity College accredited professional course in voice education, studying voice technique, anatomy and care under Janice Chapman, professors Graham Welch, Colin Durrant, Thom Hans and Jacob Lieberman.

Personal life 
Burton is a Christian, of the Seventh-Day Adventist faith. He is married to Yasmina Solé, who was born in Barcelona and grew up in Valencia, Spain. They married in Spain in 2004, and their son Kenán was born in March 2007. Burton is the youngest of 10 children; his oldest siblings were born in Jamaica, the eldest two living there. He is brother of Professor Dr. Keith Augustus Burton, an author and university professor at Oakwood Adventist University in Alabama. Dr Burton was a theology student at the university at the same time as members of Take Six. Burton's sister Vanessa resides in San Antonio, and is a recipient of the Texas Teacher of the Year Award.

BBC Songs Of Praise 
Burton works regularly with Songs Of Praise, one of the longest running music programmes on the United Kingdom's premier national television channel, BBC1.

On the programme, he has arranged, conducted and performed hundreds of songs. His arrangements have been for choirs, orchestras, ensembles and soloists, including Heather Small, Beverley Knight, Ruby Turner, Jermain Jackman, Ruthie Henshall, Donnie McClurkin, Eddi Reader, Shaun Escoffery, Aled Jones, Angel Blue and Laura Wright. 

Programmes involved with since 2013:

References

External links 

https://web.archive.org/web/20120501015042/http://www.ellison-intl.freeserve.co.uk/ken_burton.htm
"Ken Burton", iamaonline.com
"Ken Burton, Composer, Conductor" at Ellison & Strømsholm 
"Ken Burton and the London Adventist Chorale", music@monkton, 1 April 2013
http://www.choiroftheyear.co.uk/judges.htm
"'Good News' Through Music", National Choir Competition of the Year
"Be part of the London 2012 Cultural Olympiad", BBC Leeds, 24 December 2010.

1970 births
Living people
English classical singers
English composers
English conductors (music)
English choral conductors
21st-century English singers
People educated at Trinity School of John Whitgift